Dem Rădulescu (21 September 1931 – 17 September 2000) was a Romanian theatre, film and television actor, and academic. He was also a professor at the Caragiale National University of Theatre and Film in Bucharest.

Personal life
Rădulescu was born in Râmnicu Vâlcea in a family of merchants. After graduating from the Nicolae Bălcescu High School (now known as Alexandru Lahovari National College) in Râmnicu Vâlcea, he had to make a choice between a career as a professional sportsman (boxing) and acting. He was even awarded a golden star at an amateur boxing championship.

In 1956, he won first prize for interpreting "Steaguri pe turnuri" (he played the bandit Rijikov) at a contest dedicated to young actors. He was then scouted by Sică Alexandrescu which meant the beginning of Rădulescu's acting career. Liviu Ciulei called Dem Rădulescu "a genius of acting".

He died of a heart attack on 17 September 2000 in București, after previously having suffered a stroke.

Selected filmography

Secretul cifrului (1960)
Telegrame (1960) - Alt jucator de biliard
Vacanța la mare (1963)
A fost prietenul meu (1963)
La vârsta dragostei (1963) - Guta
Un surâs în plină vară (1963) - Petrica
Politică și... delicatese (1963)
Dragoste la zero grade (1964) - Brica
Gaudeamus igitur (1965) - Spirea
Neamul Șoimăreștilor (1965) - Lie, Tudor Soimaru's Servant
The Lace Wars (1965)
La porțile pământului (1966) - Bibanul
Corigența domnului professor (1966) - Macearul
Sept hommes et une garce (1966) - colonel von Schlering
Subteranul (1967) - Olteanu
De trei ori București (1967) - (segment "Aterizare forţată")
Vin cicliștii (1968) - Mişu
K.O. (1968) - Flinta
Brigada Diverse intră în acțiune (1970) - Gogu Steriade
B.D. în alerta - Profesorul de mimica (1970) - Gogu Steriade
Antinevralgicu (1970, TV Short) 
Brigada Diverse în alertă! (1970) - Gogu Steriade
Frații (1971) - Gogu Steriade
B.D. la munte și la mare (1971) - Gogu Steriade
B.D. în alerta - Vaduve cu termen redus (1971) - Gogu Steriade
Tonight We'll Dance at Home (1972) - Temistocle
Veronica (1973) - Motanul Dănilă 
Explozia (1973) - Neagu
Veronica se întoarce (1973) - Motanul Dănilă
Originea și evoluția vehiculelor (1973, TV Short) 
Comedie fantastică (1975) - Extraterestul
Serenada pentru etajul XII (1976) - Ambulance Driver
 Premiera (1976) - Fanache Verzea
Bufetul mimoza (1976, TV Short) 
Tufa de Veneția (1977)
O Scrisoare pierdută (1977, TV Movie) - Tache Farfuridi
Fair Play (1977) 
Aurel Vlaicu (1977) - I. L. Caragiale
Eu, tu și Ovidiu (1978) - Tov. Ionescu
Expresul de Buftea (1978) - Regizor / dur
Brațele Afroditei (1979) - Rotaru
Șapca şi pălăria (1979, TV Short) 
Șantaj (1981)
Saltimbancii (1981) - Cezar Siboli
Grăbește-te încet (1981)
Destine romantice (1981)
Am o idee (1981) - Antrenor 1
Milionar la minut (1982, TV Series)
Un Saltimbanc la Polul Nord (1983) - Siboli
Fram (1983, TV Series)
Bocet vesel (1984)
Secretul lui Bachus (1984) - Sterea
Galax, omul papusa (1984) - Professor
Coana Chirița (1986) - Grigorie Bârzoi
Primăvara bobocilor (1987)
Chirița la Iași (1987) - Grigorie Bârzoi
Uimitoarele aventuri ale mușchetarilor (1988) - Mischellieu (voice)
Secretul armei secrete (1988) - Marele Sfetnic
Omul din Buzău (1988, TV Short)
Harababura (1990)
O Invitație (1993, TV Short)
A doua cădere a Constantinopolului (1994)
Politică înaltă (1994, TV Short)
Titanic vals (1994) - Spiridon "Spirache" Necșulescu
Atmosfera încărcată (1996, TV Short) - (final appearance)

References

2000 deaths
1931 births
People from Râmnicu Vâlcea
20th-century Romanian male actors
Romanian male film actors
Burials at Bellu Cemetery
Recipients of the Order of Cultural Merit (Romania)